There have been two baronetcies created for members of the Baring family, one in the Baronetage of Great Britain and one in the Baronetage of the United Kingdom.

The Baring baronetcy, of Larkbeer in the County of Devon, was created in the Baronetage of Great Britain on 29 May 1793 for the influential banker Francis Baring. For more information on this creation, see Baron Northbrook.

The Baring baronetcy, of Nubia House in the parish of Northwood in Isle of Wight, was created in the Baronetage of the United Kingdom on 4 February 1911 for the Liberal politician Godfrey Baring. He was the son of Lieutenant-General Charles Baring, son of Henry Bingham Baring, son of Henry Baring, third son of the first Baronet of the 1793 creation. Godfrey Baring was succeeded by his eldest son Thomas, the second Baronet. Sir Thomas was a Major in the Coldstream Guards. He died childless and was succeeded by his nephew John Francis, the third Baronet and (as of 2012) present holder of the title.

Baring baronets, of Larkbeer (1793)
 Francis Baring, 1st Baronet (1740–1810)
 Thomas Baring, 2nd Baronet (1772–1848)
 Francis Baring, 3rd Baronet (1796–1866) (created Baron Northbrook in 1866)

Baring baronets, of Nubia House (1911)
Sir Godfrey Baring, 1st Baronet (1871–1957)
Sir Charles Christian Baring, 2nd Baronet (1898–1990)
Sir John Francis Baring, 3rd Baronet (born 1947)

Line of succession

 Sir Godfrey Baring, 1st Baronet (1871–1957)
 Maj. Sir Charles Christian Baring, 2nd Baronet (1898–1990)
 Raymond Alexander Baring (1912–1967)
 Sir John Francis Baring, 3rd Baronet (born 1947)
 (1) Julian Alexander David Baring (born 1975)
 (2) James Francis Baring (born 1984)
 Andrew Michael Godfrey Baring (1949–1999)
 (3) Alexander Francis Baring (born 1978)
 (4) Edward George Baring (born 1980)
 (5) Andrew Thomas Baring (born 1983)

Family tree

See also
Baron Ashburton
Earl of Cromer
Baron Revelstoke
Baron Howick of Glendale
Barings Bank
Maurice Baring

Notes

References

Baronetcies in the Baronetage of Great Britain
1793 establishments in Great Britain
1911 establishments in the United Kingdom
Baring baronets
Baronetcies in the Baronetage of the United Kingdom